Daniil Fominykh (born 28 August 1991) is a Kazakh former road cyclist, who competed as a professional from 2012 to 2021. He now works as a directeur sportif for UCI Continental team .

Major results
Source: 

2008
 3rd Overall Coupe des Nations Abitibi
2010
 3rd Time trial, National Road Championships
2012
 3rd Time trial, National Road Championships
 9th Overall Thüringen Rundfahrt der U23
2013
 1st  Time trial, Asian Under-23 Road Championships
 3rd Time trial, National Road Championships
 3rd Overall Tour of Qinghai Lake
 9th Time trial, UCI Under-23 Road World Championships
2014
 1st  Time trial, National Road Championships
2015
 2nd Time trial, National Road Championships
2016
 1st Stage 2 (TTT) Vuelta a Burgos
2017
 1st  Team time trial, Asian Road Championships
 4th Road race, National Road Championships
2018
 1st  Time trial, National Road Championships
2019
 Asian Road Championships
1st  Time trial
1st  Team time trial
6th Road race
 3rd Time trial, National Road Championships
2021
 1st  Time trial, National Road Championships

References

External links

1991 births
Living people
Kazakhstani male cyclists
People from Petropavl
Cyclists at the 2018 Asian Games
Asian Games competitors for Kazakhstan
21st-century Kazakhstani people